Inger Lassen (27 July 1911 – 30 December 1957) was a Danish film actress. She appeared in 15 films between 1940 and 1957.

Filmography
 Für zwei Groschen Zärtlichkeit (1957)
 Tre piger fra Jylland (1957)
 Der var engang en gade (1957)
 Kristiane af Marstal (1956)
 Kispus (1956)
 Bruden fra Dragstrup (1955)
 Der kom en dag (1955)
 Det er så yndigt at følges ad (1954)
 Karen, Maren og Mette (1954)
 Adam og Eva (1953)
 The Old Mill on Mols (1953)
 We Who Go the Kitchen Route (1953)
 Ved kongelunden... (1953)
 Peter Andersen (1941)
 Barnet (1940)

References

External links

1911 births
1957 deaths
Danish film actresses
20th-century Danish actresses